is a JR West Geibi Line station located in Karuga-chō, Asakita-ku, Hiroshima, Hiroshima Prefecture, Japan. The 124m Dakiiwa Tunnel is located on the Miyoshi side of the station.

History
1929-03-20: Kamifukawa Station opens
1941-08-10: Kamifukawa Station ceases operation
1948-08-10: Kamifukawa Station begins operation once again
1987-04-01: Japanese National Railways is privatized, and Kamifukawa Station becomes a JR West station

Station building and platforms
Kamifukawa Station features one side platform capable of handling one line. Trains bound for Shiwaguchi and Miyoshi are handled on the upper end (上り) of the platform, and trains bound for Hiroshima are handled on the lower end (下り). The station building, as with the building at Nakafukawa Station, is used as convenient meeting place for the residents of the surrounding area. The station is unmanned but features an automated ticket vending machine.

Environs
Hiroshima Municipal Kariogawa Elementary School
Hiroshima Municipal Fukunoki Elementary School
Hiroshima Municipal Fukunoki Junior High School
Hiroshima Municipal Shinrin Park
Kōyō Driving School (高陽自動車学校)
Nakayama
Shiimurayama
Nabetsuchi Pass
Misasa River

Highway access
Chūgoku Expressway Hiroshima Higashi Interchange
 Hiroshima Prefectural Route 37 (Hiroshima-Miyoshi Route)
 Hiroshima Prefectural Route 70 (Hiroshima-Nakashima Route)

Connecting lines
All lines are JR West lines. 
Geibi Line
Miyoshi Express
No stop
Commuter Liner
No stop
Miyoshi Liner/Local
Karuga Station — Kamifukawa Station — Nakafukawa Station

External links
 JR West

Railway stations in Hiroshima Prefecture
Railway stations in Japan opened in 1929
Geibi Line
Hiroshima City Network
Stations of West Japan Railway Company in Hiroshima city